Jason Wright (born 1982) is an American football player and executive.

Jason Wright may also refer to:

Jason Wright (astronomer), American astronomer
Jason F. Wright (born 1971), American author and speaker